Lacy's Canal is a  canal which formerly linked the town of Mullingar to the northern shore of Lough Ennell in County Westmeath, Ireland. It was constructed in the 18th century and named after Hugh de Lacy, Lord of Meath, who lived in Mullingar in the 12th century. It starts at the rear of the Lynn Industrial Estate and enters Lough Ennel about 1.5 km south of Butlers Bridge. It is crossed by both Butlers Bridge and the Joe Dolan Bridge.

References

Geography of County Westmeath
Canals in Ireland
Transport in County Westmeath
Transport infrastructure completed in the 18th century
18th-century establishments in Ireland